Coralliophila bracteata is an extinct species of sea snail, a marine gastropod mollusk, in the family Muricidae, the murex snails or rock snails.

References

bracteata
Gastropods described in 1814